Woman on Fire Looks for Water is a 2009 Malaysian-South Korean drama film directed by Woo Ming Jin, starring , Chung Kok-keong, Foo Fei Ling and Jerrica Lai.

Cast
  as Ah Fei
 Chung Kok-keong as Ah Kau
 Foo Fei Ling as Lily
 Jerrica Lai as Su Lin

Reception
Darcy Paquet of Screen Daily wrote, "By juxtaposing the stories of the older man, still haunted by decisions he made in his youth, and the son who appears on the verge of making a similar mistake, Woo is able to give added resonance to both stories." Denis Harvey of Variety wrote, "Those looking for emotional fireworks and clear-cut narrative payoffs may be underwhelmed, but pic’s subtle charm and frequently ravishing visuals will cast a spell for those who are patient."

Kirk Honeycutt of The Hollywood Reporter wrote that the film "should divide audiences between those appreciative of its quiet rural rhythms and subtle charms and those gazing at watches."

References

External links
 
 

Malaysian drama films
South Korean drama films
2009 drama films
2000s South Korean films